Jordan of Quedlinburg (Latin Jordanus de Saxonia; c. 1300–1380) was an Augustinian hermit, influential writer and preacher. He is known for his advocacy of a moderate asceticism.

He was born around 1300 in Quedlinburg in the Duchy of Saxony. He studied at the Augustinian seminaries in Bologna (1317–1319) and Paris (1319–1322) under Henry of Friemar, Hermann of Halle and Prosper of Reggio. He graduated with the degree of lector and was appointed to a lectureship at the Augustinian studium generale in Erfurt, where he taught from 1327 at the latest until 1333. By 1336 he had transferred to the studium generale of Magdeburg, where stayed until 1338. He lectured in various other Augustinian houses in Germany and in 1341 was appointed provincial of Saxony, an office to which he was reappointed continuously until 1351. In Saxony he reorganized the Augustinians into a mendicant order. In 1343 he was appointed visitor of the Augustinian province of France.

Jordan's later life and the date and circumstances of his death are disputed. He is thought to have lived for a time in Vienna in the Duchy of Austria, dying there in 1380. Several of his associates are known to have been connected to the University of Vienna, founded in 1365. Some scholars, however, believe that he spent his final years in Vienne in the Dauphiné and died there. His death is usually placed in 1380, but sometimes as early as 1370.

He is remembered chiefly for his preaching and his spiritual writings. His sermons were popular in the later Middle Ages and one collection circulated widely. His spirituality was influenced by German mysticism, but he attacked the excesses of the ascetic movement. His most important work in this vein was his Liber vitasfratrum, which was printed at Rome in 1587. His other known works include:
Meditations on the Passion of Christ
Tractatus de spiritu libertatis (lost)
Expositio dominicae orationis (unpublished)
Opus postillarum et sermonum de tempore (printed at Strasbourg in 1483)
Sermones de sanctis (Paris, 1484)
Collectanea seu Speculum Augustinianum (Paris, 1686)

References

Bibliography

External links
Jordan, von Quedlinburg, approximately 1299–1380 at Medieval Manuscripts in Oxford Libraries

1380 deaths
People from Quedlinburg
Augustinian friars
Year of birth uncertain